Shawn Williamson (born April 26, 1965) is a Canadian film and television producer based in Vancouver, British Columbia, Canada.

Early life 
Williamson was born in Vancouver, British Columbia, Canada. Shawn began his career as a stage manager at The Arts Club Theatre in 1983 and has since produced live events, live television and television series, as well as feature films.

Career 
In 2001, Williamson started Brightlight Pictures and has since been developing, financing, and producing feature films and television series. He has filmed in a variety of international locations, including: Singapore, Croatia, Romania, France, England, Northern Ireland, South Africa, and Australia. Fifty Dead Men Walking (Ben Kingsley, Jim Sturgess) was produced as a Canada/UK co-production, filmed in Belfast, and opened with a Gala Premier spot at the Toronto International Film Festival.

Williamson executive produced the feature film The Interview (Seth Rogen, James Franco) for Columbia Pictures, and Horns (Daniel Radcliffe), produced in conjunction with Mandalay Pictures and Red Granite Pictures. He also served as a producer on The Company You Keep (Robert Redford, Shia LaBeouf) with Voltage pictures, 50/50 (Joseph Gordon-Levitt, Seth Rogen), The Possession (Jeffrey Dean Morgan, Kyra Sedgwick), White Noise (Michael Keaton), Passengers (Anne Hathaway, Patrick Wilson), and Wicker Man (Nicolas Cage).

Filmography

Films 
 Every Breath You Take (2021)
 2 Hearts (2020)
 Elsewhere (2019)
 Summer of 84(2018)
 The Package (2018)
 Status Update (2018)
 Scorched Earth (2018) 
 1922 (2017)
 Colossal (2016)
 Un-Break My Heart (2016) 
 This Is Your Death (2016)
 Little Pink House (2016)
 The 9th Life of Louis Drax (2016)
 Life on the Line (2015)
 The Unspoken (2015) 
 The Interview (2014) 
 Leap 4 Your Life (2013)
 Horns (2013)
 Assault on Wall Street (2013)
 The Package (2012)
 The Company You Keep (2012)
 The Possession (2012)
 In the Name of the King: Two Worlds (2011)
 50/50 (2011)
 Apollo 18 (2011)
 Max Schmeling (2010)
 Frankie & Alice (2010)
 Gunless (2010)
 The Final Storm (2010)
 Attack on Darfur (2009)
 The Thaw (2009)
 Rampage (2009)
 Stoic (2009)
 Possession (2008) 
 Far Cry (2008) 
 Passengers (2008) 
 Fifty Dead Men Walking (2008)
 1968 Tunnel Rats (2008) 
 Normal (2007)
 American Venus (2007)
 They Wait (2007)
 Postal (2007) 
 Whisper (2007)
 In the Name of the King: A Dungeon Siege Tale (2007)
 88 Minutes (2007)
 White Noise 2: The Light (2007)
 Seed (2006)
 Wicker Man (2006)
 Slither (2006)
 BloodRayne (2005)
 Severed (2005)
 The Long Weekend (2005)
 Edison (2005)
 Alone in the Dark (2005)
 White Noise (2005)
 Pink Ludoos (2004)
 Jiminy Glick in Lalawood (2004)
 Going the Distance (2004)
 Lies Like Truth (2004)
 House of the Dead (2003)
 It's All About Love (2003)
 Punch (2002)
 Try Seventeen (2002)
 Heart of America (2002)
 Sea (2001)
 Blackwoods (2001)
 Finder's Fee (2001)
 Sanctimony (2000)
 Tail Lights Fade (1999)

Television

Television series 
 The Mighty Ducks: Game Changers (TV series) (2021) 
 The Barbarian and the Troll (TV series) (2021) 
 Firefly Lane (TV Series) (2021) 
 The Good Doctor (2017-2021)
 Julie and the Phantoms (TV Series) (2020)
 Upload (2020)
 50 States of Fright (2020)
 Valley of the Boom (2019)
 The Murders (2019)
 Mystery 101 (TV series) (2019-2020)
 Haters Back Off (2016-2017)
 Timeless (2016)
 Wayward Pines (2016)
 Second Chance (2016)
 Aurora Teagarden Mysteries (TV Series) (2015-2021)
 Quest OutWest: Wild Food (2015-2020)
 Witches of East End (2013-2014)
 Rush (2014)
 Stormworld (2009)
 The Guard (2008-2009)
 About a Girl (2007-2008)
 Saved (2006)
 Alienated (2003-2004)
 Los Luchadores (2000–2001)
 Hollywood Off-Ramp (2000)
 The Charlie Horse Music Pizza (1998)
 Lamb Chop's Play-Along (1992)

Television films 
 Don't Go Breaking My Heart (2021)
 Cross Country Christmas (2020)
 A Sugar & Spice Holiday (2020)
 A Glenbrooke Christmas (2020)
 Love, Lights, Hanukkah! (2020)
 Sleeping with Danger (2020)
 Poisoned Love: The Stacey Castor Story (2020)
 Hearts of Winter (2020)
 A Doggone Christmas (2019)
 It's Beginning to Look a Lot Like Christmas (2019)
 A Homecoming for the Holidays (2019)
 Christmas Unleashed (2019)
 Christmas Town (2019)
 A Very Vintage Christmas (2019)
 Descendants 3 (2019)
 Family Pictures (2019)
 To Have and to Hold (2019)
 Harry & Meghan: Becoming Royal (2019)
 Bottled with Love (2019)
 Victoria Gotti: My Father's Daughter  (2019)
 Valentine in the Vineyard (2019)
 Jingle Around the Clock (2018)
 Welcome to Christmas (2018)
 A Twist of Christmas (2018)
 The Girl in the Bathtub (2018)
 Harry & Meghan: A Royal Romance (2018)
 Frozen in Love (2018)
 Secret Millionaire (2018)
 Doomsday (2017)
 Yellow (2017)
 Royal New Year's Eve (2017)
 The Christmas Cottage (2017)
 Christmas at Holly Lodge (2017)
 Christmas Homecoming (2017)
 I Am Elizabeth Smart (2017)
 Marry Me at Christmas (2017)
 A Harvest Wedding(2017)
 Descendants 2 (2017)
 Little Pink House (2017)
 Nightmare Time (2016)
 A Christmas to Remember (2016)
 Christmas List (2016)
 Operation Christmas (2016)
 Who Killed JonBenét? (2016)
 Autumn in the Vineyard (2016)
 Twist of Fate (2016)
 Adventures in Babysitting (2016)
 Sandra Brown's White Hot (2016)
 All Yours (2016)
 Toni Braxton: Unbreak My Heart (2016)
 Evil Men (2015)
 The Hollow (2015)
 Just the Way You Are (2015)
 Aurora Teagarden Mystery: A Bone to Pick (2015)
 I Do, I Do, I Do (2015)
 Vow of Violence (2014)
 Damaged (2014)
 Grumpy Cat's Worst Christmas Ever (2014)
 The Christmas Secret (2014)
 Recipe for Love (2013)
 Stolen from the Womb (2013)
 The Color of Rain (2013)
 The Good Mistress (2013)
 Hats Off to Christmas! (2013)
 Let It Snow (2013)
 Scarecrow (2013)
 Mr Hockey: The Gordie Howe Story (2013)
 Profile for Murder (2013)
 The Trainer (2013)
 Twist of Faith (2013)
 Nearlyweds (2013)
 Finding Mrs. Claus (2012)
 The Wishing Tree (2012)
 Love at the Thanksgiving Day Parade (2012)
 Gone (2011)
 Battle of the Bulbs (2010)
 Shooting Gunless (2010)
 Mistresses (2009)
 A.M.P.E.D. (2007)
 Kraken: Tentacles of the Deep (2006)
 Bratty Babies (2005)
 Marker (2005)
 Johnny Total (2005)
 Cable Beach (2004)
 Mob Princess (2003)
 Dead in a Heartbeat (2002)
 Romantic Comedy 101 (2002)
 Till Dad Do Us Part (2001)
 Spinning Out of Control (2001) 
 Leo's Journey (2000) 
 Murder at the Cannes Film Festival (2000) 
 Special Delivery (2000) 
 Final Ascent (2000) 
 Becoming Dick (2000) 
 The Man Who Used to Be Me (2000) 
 The Spiral Staircase (2000) 
 Best Actress (2000) 
 Ice Angel (2000)
 Heaven's Fire (1999)
 Don't Look Behind You (1999)
 The Darklings (1999)
 Catch Me If You Can (1998) 
 Shari's Passover Surprise (1996)
 Lamb Chop's Special Chanukah (1995)

Professional awards

References

External links 
 

1965 births
Living people
Film producers from British Columbia
Canadian television producers
People from Vancouver